The Texas rig is a fishing rig used for angling with soft plastic lures. It involves a bullet-shaped weight being threaded onto the fishing line first, followed by a glass or plastic bead crimped tight onto the line, and then the line is secured to a fish hook, usually an offset worm hook. The hook is then inserted into the head region of a worm lure and exits about  down the worm. The worm is then moved up the hook towards the shank and then rotated so that the worm is now "locked" on the shank.  The point of the hook is then threaded back into the body of the worm to make the rig "weedless" (i.e. unlike to snag on underwater vegetations).  

The crimped bead is fully optional, but some anglers find that the added noise or color provided by a bead can give them an advantage in stained or muddied water, because the clicking sound of a sliding sinker hitting the bead imitates a crayfish crawling over rocks and debris; while other anglers think that the bead detracts from a realistic presentation considering that most natural worms will not click.  

When fishing in open water without much cover to snag on, the Texpose rig is a better choice than a Texas rig because it increases the number of fish hooked. A Texpose rig is set up the same as a Texas rig with the exception that the hook point is pushed all the way through the body of the worm so it is slightly exposed. With a Texas rig, less fish will be hooked than with a Texpose because the hook point is not exposed; however, the occluded point deters hang ups on debris. The Texpose does not increase bite rate, but its exposed point increases the chance a biting fish will be hooked.

The Texas rig can be a search bait if swam through a water column just like a spinnerbait or a crankbait. Although not as effective as a search bait. It is usually fished by casting as close to cover as possible with the goal of placing the worm as close to a bass as possible.  Ideally, the lure enters the water with as little noise as possible, and with some controlled slack in the line, as bass will commonly attack the lure while it is sinking to the bottom.

See also
Dropshotting
Carolina rig

Notes

External links
Bassresource.com Texas Rig

Recreational fishing